Thomas Burrage Cooke (November 21, 1778 – November 20, 1853) was a United States representative from New York.

Biography
Born in Wallingford, Connecticut, he moved to New York about 1802 and settled in Catskill. He engaged in mercantile pursuits; and was elected as a Democratic-Republican to the Twelfth Congress, holding office from March 4, 1811 to March 4, 1813. He was elected president of what is now the Catskill National Bank in 1813 and took the oath of office as justice of the peace on September 2, 1818. He engaged in the water freighting business in 1823 and was also interested in agricultural pursuits. He became one of the incorporators of the Catskill & Canajoharie Railway on April 19, 1830 and was a member of the New York State Assembly in 1838 and 1839. He died in Catskill in 1853; and was interred in Catskill Village Cemetery.

References

1778 births
1853 deaths
People from Wallingford, Connecticut
New York (state) state court judges
Members of the New York State Assembly
Democratic-Republican Party members of the United States House of Representatives from New York (state)